Dzikamai Gwaze (born 22 April 1989) is a Zimbabwean footballer who plays as a right winger for Polish club LZS Piotrówka.

Career

International
Gwaze made his debut for the Zimbabwe national football team in a friendly 2-0 win over Uganda.

References

External links
 
 

1989 births
Living people
Association football midfielders
Zimbabwean footballers
Zimbabwe international footballers
LZS Piotrówka players
Pogoń Szczecin players
Górnik Zabrze players
Ekstraklasa players
I liga players
IV liga players
Zimbabwean expatriate footballers
Expatriate footballers in Poland
Zimbabwean expatriate sportspeople in Poland